Dieteria is a North American genus of flowering plants in the family Asteraceae.

The genus Dieteria is closely related to Machaeranthera but distinguished  by having entire to toothed leaves, whereas Machaeranthera has once or twice pinnate leaves.

Species
 Dieteria bigelovii (A.Gray) D.R.Morgan & R.L.Hartm. - Arizona, New Mexico, Colorado, Utah, Wyoming
Dieteria canescens (Pursh) Nutt. - most of western United States and western Canada; Chihuahua

formerly included
Dieteria asteroides Torr. - now called Machaeranthera asteroides (Torr.) Greene - Chihuahua, Durango, California, Nevada, Arizona, New Mexico, Colorado

References

Astereae
Asteraceae genera
Flora of North America